Telphusa distictella is a moth of the family Gelechiidae. It is found in Puerto Rico.

References

Moths described in 1931
Telphusa